Belgium has the following national youth football teams:

 Belgium national under-21 football team
 Belgium national under-19 football team
 Belgium national under-18 football team
 Belgium national under-17 football team

Youth